Zabell is a surname. Notable people with the surname include:

 Simon Zabell (born 1970), British artist
 Theresa Zabell (born 1965), Spanish sailor

See also
 Zabel (disambiguation)